The Sunbury Shale is a geologic formation in Michigan. It preserves fossils dating back to the Mississippian period.

References

Carboniferous Michigan
Mississippian United States
Tournaisian